Jrashen, is a village in the Armavir Province of Armenia. It was founded in 1928. According to the 2001 census, the population was 727.

See also 
Armavir Province

References 

 (as Dzhrashen)
Kiesling, Rediscovering Armenia, p. 39, available online at the US embassy to Armenia's website

Populated places in Armavir Province
Populated places established in 1928
Cities and towns built in the Soviet Union